Tsukuda Station is the name of two train stations in Japan:

 Tsukuda Station (Gunma) (津久田駅)
 Tsukuda Station (Tokushima) (佃駅)